Leroy Dean Chambers (born 25 October 1972) in Sheffield, England, is an English retired professional footballer. He made appearances in the Football League for Chester City and Macclesfield Town and turned out for a large number of non-league sides. He started his career at Sheffield Wednesday spending five years at the club

External links

1972 births
Living people
Footballers from Sheffield
English footballers
Association football forwards
Sheffield Wednesday F.C. players
Chester City F.C. players
Boston United F.C. players
Macclesfield Town F.C. players
Altrincham F.C. players
Kettering Town F.C. players
Hucknall Town F.C. players
Bradford (Park Avenue) A.F.C. players
Frickley Athletic F.C. players
Belper Town F.C. players
Droylsden F.C. players
Matlock Town F.C. players
Buxton F.C. players
English Football League players